Vampires are fictional characters appearing in American comic books published by Marvel Comics. The concept of the Vampire has been depicted by Marvel to varying degrees of significance. Bearing strong resemblance to their literary counterparts, Marvel vampires mostly are an undead subspecies of humans which sustain their immortality and paranormal power by drinking the blood of the living. Unlike most other depictions of the creature, these vampires have their roots in both the supernatural and biology. Victims are converted to vampirism via enzymes carried in the vampire's saliva which cause reanimation once introduced into the bloodstream during feedings.

Fictional history
The first generation of vampires appeared in the legendary city of Atlantis roughly fifteen thousand years prior to modern times. A circle of Atlantean sorcerers uncovered a book known as the Darkhold - an indestructible grimoire of shadowy magics written by the Elder God Chthon. Amid a war, these sorcerers used a resurrection ritual described in the text to raise their fallen enemies hoping to create a legion of unkillable soldiers. However, because of the dark influence of Chthon, these undead were too powerful for their would-be masters. In an act of rebellion, the vampires slew all the sorcerers except for one - the priest Varnae, the first vampire who used the spell to save himself from death. With Atlantis sinking below the sea, Varnae and his kin fled the continent and spread out into the world.

As the eldest and most magically endowed of his kind, Varnae reigned as the unchallenged lord of vampires for many millennia until finally ceding the title to Vlad III Dracula, a 15th Century Voivode of Wallachia and a notorious warlord known by the pseudonym of Vlad the Impaler. Carrying the title well into the 21st Century, it was not until Doctor Strange - the Sorcerer Supreme of Earth - discovered a ritual within the Darkhold itself that could essentially reverse the magics of the original resurrection spell and exile all vampires into Chthon's realm. Although the ritual appeared to work, with much of the undead population being purged, something went wrong in the invocation itself. While the vampire race was rendered nearly extinct, some - including Dracula himself - survived and continues to propagate their brood.

Characteristics
The vampires of the Marvel Universe share many of the same attributes of their literary counterparts. These fictional characters are characterized as having superhuman strength and speed and superior senses and accelerated healing, which can be further quickened by drinking fresh blood. Vampires who are centuries old are noted for being both physically stronger and more intellectually refined than younger vampires. While this doesn't make them invincible to a seasoned supernatural hunter such as Blade, it gives them an advantage over their lesser kin.

Transformation 
The transformation from a living creature to a vampire begins moments after a victim dies from being fed upon. The vampiric enzyme introduced into their system triggers a metabolic change within their necrotic cells, which produces a greenish preservative substance known as ichor. Provided the corpse remains undisturbed and, with the heart and brain preserved, the ichor will begin to autonomously flow throughout the cardiovascular system; replacing the blood that was taken as it gradually reconstructs and reanimates the body over several days.

Even if a victim survives being fed upon, the enzyme in their blood will cause temporary anemia and a heightened susceptibility to psychic influence by their attacker. It is also not unheard of for a victim to become erotically fixated on their attacker. Although uncommon, it is theoretically possible for a survivor to begin the transformation if they die before the enzyme leaves their system naturally. It is possible for practiced vampires to drain a victim dry and not turn them by carefully sucking out the enzyme.

Prowess 
All newborn vampires experience a dramatic increase in the power of both their bodies and their senses upon their resurrection. They can hear a heartbeat across a yard and see in complete darkness and follow a person's scent for miles. Their skin is sensitive to body heat. Their strength and speed are likewise amplified; able to lift a single car with ease and cross a room almost instantaneously and even leap between buildings. This enabled them to catch and subdue any victim with minimal effort, as well as making them highly lethal fighters.

Count Dracula and his predecessor Varnae are exceptionally strong, having been observed lifting over 14 and 17 tons, respectively. This is believed to be because of their advanced age and special status as successive rulers of Earth's vampires.

Willpower 
The overall extent of a vampire's abilities depended upon the strength of the vampire's will. Exceptional vampires with powerful wills, such as Dracula or Varnae, could summon and controlling thunderstorms, even though the mystical concentration required to do so left them extremely weak for a certain period. The vampire's willpower could also determine the extent to which he or she could master their craving for blood and keep the same personality they had in life. However, most people that became vampires quickly found themselves unable to resist the all-consuming craving for blood. They quickly degenerated into cruel and animalistic hunters of ordinary human beings, even if these new vampires had been kind and sensitive people in their mortal lives.

Summoning and shapeshifting
Vampires could summon and control certain creatures, such as bats, wolves, and rats. The fictional characters, vampires, could also transform themselves into bats, and with some vampires, wolves, while retaining their human intelligence in these forms. Some vampires could even become human-sized bats. Vampires could also transform themselves into mist at will, while still keeping their normal consciousnesses in that form.

Hypnosis
A vampire could make most human beings into his or her temporary slave if he or she could catch their gaze for a sufficient amount of time, usually only a matter of seconds. The exact time needed to mesmerize the victim depended on the strength of the will of the vampire and that of his or her victim.

Regeneration and immortality
Vampires were rendered immune to the ravages of disease and of aging. However, if deprived of blood for a lengthy period, a vampire shows distinct signs of aging, such as his or her hair turning gray. Upon ingesting fresh blood, the vampire would revert to the age in which he or she had been at the time of death.

In most cases, vampires could heal themselves from minor injuries within a very brief period. Some vampires, such as Count Dracula, could heal from severe burns or broken bones within a few hours, whereas most other vampires might require several days to heal exactly the same injury. Vampires could not regenerate missing organs or severed portions of their anatomy, except for hair and skin. Apart from periodic inconveniences, injuries like these would not critically impair a vampire's effectiveness. Because the ichor was similar in function to blood, poisons and other toxic substances that were circulated in its bloodstream would adversely affect a vampire, although no dosage was large enough to cause them dying.

Weaknesses and limitations

Weaknesses
Vampires had many limitations imposed upon their supernatural abilities, and even upon their very existence.

Destruction
The only substances which could cause a vampire pain were silver and, to a lesser extent, unless it penetrated the Vampire's heart, wood. The surest way to kill a vampire was to drive a wooden stake or a silver blade through his or her heart. The stake or blade prevented the heart from supplying ichor to the rest of the body. If the stake or blade was removed, however, even if the Vampire's body had crumbled to dust, the Vampire's mystical vitality would restore his or her body to the condition it had before the Vampire was slain, and return him or her to Vampiric "life." Beheading a vampire would also kill him or her, as well as extensive damage to most of his or her body. However, there were only three methods of making sure of destroying a vampire permanently. One was to expose the Vampire to direct sunlight and then to scatter the ashes. Another was to pierce the Vampire's heart with wood or silver, sever his or her head, burn the head and body in separate places and scatter the two resulting piles of ashes in separate locations. The third was mystical, most notably by using the incantation known as the Montesi Formula (after the monk who first realized its significance). Montesi created the incantation by studying fragmentary copies of the Darkhold. It was lost amid many other documents copied by various anonymous monks over the centuries. Research conducted by various vampirehunters over the past few decades revealed its significance, and it was sought by both those hunters and by Dracula, who wished to destroy all copies of it. The incantation apparently cancelled the mystic curse that allowed any vampire within earshot to exist, causing it to crumple to dust. The danger is that, as the Montesi Formula was created from black magic theory from the Darkhold, those untrained in the mystic arts who use it lose their souls.

At one point, a cult who worshipped the elder Demon Gods apparently fixated on Dracula as a recipient of their power. Dracula gave them the fragments of the Darkhold he had discovered; the cultists (who were low-level mystics) repeatedly recast the original spells that created the first Vampires. This increased Dracula's powers considerably, and he lost his vulnerability to sunlight and others. Dracula could take full control of their minds (as well as anyone around the world that Dracula had ever hypnotized in the past, at will).

Doctor Strange (who at the time was in a great battle with Dracula), was aware of the Montesi Formula. He tracked down the Darkhold, and, using the original source material to study the spells that created Vampires, Doctor Strange created a massive version of the Montesi Formula (backed by his power as Sorcerer Supreme) to wipe out all Vampires in the Marvel Universe.

As shown in the Runaways series, staking a Vampire is not always completely effective. Nico Minoru shoots the Staff of One completely through the Vampire Topher without permanent damage. However, Topher was defeated when he drank Karolina Dean's blood, which contains pure solar energy (Karolina is a Majesdanian, an alien race that lives within a star).

Living Vampires and pseudo-vampires
Living Vampires and Pseudo-vampires are vampires that were not created with the magic of the Darkhold, but originated through alternate means like science, mutations, or magic other than that of the Darkhold. They usually possess many vampiric qualities, including appearance and many similar superhuman abilities, but rarely possess their vulnerabilities. Examples of these pseudo-vampires include: Blade, Michael Morbius, Hunger, and Bloodscream.

Vampire sects
In 2010, Marvel introduced the idea of Vampire sects as part of a general "revamping" of the Vampires in the Marvel Universe, as seen in "Curse of the Mutants". Sects are diverse as human religions and vampires from different sects might have different characteristics or abilities. The sects shown so far in the one-shot issue Death of Dracula are:

 Anchorite Sect - Rural outcasts who prefer to hide from humanity and live in peace.
 Aqueos Sect - A race of vampire-converted Atlanteans similar in appearance to the Gill-man from the film Creature from the Black Lagoon. They were thought to have been extinct until human developments in the ocean brought them out of hiding.
 Claw Sect - Middle Eastern-type warriors. They are rivals of the Krieger.
 Charniputra Sect - A race of gargoyle-like vampire subspecies that are mostly seen flying in the Himalayas. Charniputra also have a tough hide that is complicated to damage without the weaknesses.
 Huskie Sect - A race of vampires that are revived as mindless, animalistic creatures. They only follow their base instinct and feed on small animals. The Huskie Sect will not rest until they have completed a task from their human life.
 Jumlin Sect - A race of vampires that are associated with Native American lore and are allegedly the first vampires on Earth.
 Krieger Sect - Western-type warriors. They are one of the strongest sects.
 Moksha Sect - A group of vampire prophets who gain their powers by feeding as little as possible.
 Mystikos Sect - A group of business vampires with skills at technology.
 Nosferatu Sect - Similar to Count Orlok, their need for powerful blood sometimes drives them to attack other Vampires.
 Pureblood Sect - A group comprising vampires that were born as vampires.
 Siren Sect - All-beautiful female vampires with powers of seduction.
 Tryk Sect - A powerful, parasitic subspecies of vampires that prefer the blood of other vampires.

A few sects did not appear in the issue. These include:

 Adze Sect - A race of African vampires who can survive the usually instantaneous methods of vampire destruction for 10 minutes.
 Ancient Sect - A race of Italian vampires with superior, superhuman speed and healing factor compared to that of other vampires.
 Mortuus Invitus - A sect of vampires who oppose other vampires. They assisted Noah van Helsing's Vampire Hunters against Dracula.
 The Forgiven - Founded by Raizo Kodo, this legion is composed by vampires who try to maintain their humanity and coexist with humans, drinking blood from animals instead of human blood. Members of this group include former X-Man Jubilee.
 Yuki Onna - A race of Japanese vampires (named after the mythological creature of the same name) with the power to turn into ice storms rather than fog as most Vampires can

Known vampires
The following vampires are listed in alphabetical order:

 Adze - Guyana, assaulted village of Benjamin Alomii; slaughtered half of them; and turned the remainder of the village into vampires; destroyed by Ben Alomiij
 Count Von Stadt - a mutant turned into a vampire who could shoot laser beams from his eyes. He was killed by Blade.
 Dragoness - a mutant villain, she was turned into a vampire by the Creeds.
 Jamal Afari - raised Blade after Madame Vanity from the age of nine to adulthood; later transformed into vampire by Dracula; destroyed by Blade then later revived in modern era and allied with Dracula; briefly vamped Spider-Man; destroyed by Blade again
 Katherine Ainsley-Jones
 Akivashas - Hyborian Era Stygian vampires
 Tara Algren - reporter for the Mightnight Sun who was killed and vampirized by Dracula while investigating a cult; later lured her girlfriend Bethany Flynn into Dracula's fangs as well
 Benjamin Solomon Alomii - Member of Noah van Helsing's Vampire Hunters; began hunting Adze vampires of Guyana after his infected wife devoured their children and half of their village; eventually transformed into a vampire by the Adze; destroyed by Blade
 Anita Alomii - The infected wife of Ben Alomii; devoured their children and half of their village after being turned by Adze; destroyed by Ben
 Alonzo - c. 1926; former agent of Nick Diablo; sired by Dracula
 Amenhotep - 5,000 years old; forcingly converted into a vampiric tomb guard by Rama-Tut; battled the original Swordsman; died when accidentally exposing himself to sunlight
 Emily Arthurs - school teacher who was vampirized by Dracula
 Ezra Asher - ex-wife of detective Antonio Vargus; former ally of Saint Cyrus Leviticus
 Baby
 Baron Blood I (John Falsworth) - c. World War II; member of the Super-Axis and the Legion of the Unliving; brother of Union Jack I (Montgomery Falsworth); uncle of Spitfire (Jacqueline Falsworth Critchton); great-uncle of Baron Blood III (Kenneth Crichton); transformed by Dracula; mutated by surgery from Nazi scientists; beheaded in modern times by Captain America
 Baron Blood III (Kenneth Critchton) - son of Spitfire (Jacqueline Falsworth Crichton); nephew of Union Jack II (Brian Falsworth); grandson of Montgomery Falsworth; great-nephew of Baron Blood I (John Falsworth); transformed into vampire by Baroness Blood; destroyed by sunlight
 Baroness Blood (Lily Cromwell) - member of the Axis Mundi; daughter of Dr. Jacob Cromwell who was killed and replaced by Baron Blood I (Falsworth); led cult to find the Holy Grail; transformed Kenneth Crichton into Baron Blood III; impregnated by him; gained immunity to sunlight by drinking from the Grail; betrayed the cult and Baron Blood III, causing them to be consumed by sunlight
 Eddie Baxter -
 Martin Beatering -
 Louis Belski - former actor for Mallet Studios; transformed by Dracula; destroyed by the Werewolf (Jack Russell)
 Bettina
 Bitsy - ally of Federico Valencia; destroyed by Blade
 Black Baron (Rupert Kemp) - a vampire/werewolf hybrid; the 7th Baron Darkmoor; kidnapped Courtney Ross and attempted to make her his mate; killed when stabbed through the heart with a silver stake.
 Blade (Eric Brooks) - former member of the Nightstalkers and S.H.I.E.L.D.'s Howling Commandos.; son of Lucas Cross; mother killed by Deacon Frost during childbirth; trained by Jamal Afari; transformed into a pseudo-vampire by a bite from Morbius the Living Vampire
 Blade Doppelgänger - allegedly created by Deacon Frost at the same time Blade was born; attacked and absorbed Blade into itself; staked through the heart by Dracula; briefly revived and quickly destroyed by Hannibal King to allow the Son of Satan to separate Blade from it
 Bloodstorm (Dracula) - clone of Dracula created by HYDRA.
 Bloodstorm (Ororo Monroe) - an alternate vampiric version of Storm who becomes a member of the X-Men Blue
 Jack Bolt
 Bonham - leader of a subterranean group of insectoid vampires
 Father Bordia - c. 1459; held the Darkhold scrolls; staked by Dracula
 Lucas Brand - beat Dracula when he was weakened; later was turned into a vampire by Dracula; killed Faust; later trained by Dr. Sun to defeat Dracula and become Lord of the Vampires; incinerated by Dr. Sun
 Odette Byelai - a ballerina who underwent a bird-like transformation initially; staked herself as her dancing skills diminished and after Dracula forced her to turn into a bat-woman
 Carmen - a Gypsy girl who lived in c. the 19th Century; befriended the Frankenstein Monster before she was attacked by Dracula, and eventually destroyed by the Monster
 Rosella Carson - c. the 16th century; transformed by Dracula; Solomon Kane was sent to rescue her, but destroyed her when he found out that she was a vampire
 Dalton Cartwright
 Charel - member of a subterranean group of insectoid vampires
 Francois Chicault - member of the Assassin's Guild; beheaded by Blade
 Children of Eternity - legion of vampires trapped at their age as children when they were turned into vampires; slaughtered by Blade
 Children of Judas - 19th century coven of vampires and servants of Dracula; transformed Elisabeth van Helsing
 Roberta Christiansen - former pilot for CIA; transformed by Dracula; resisted him to the point of her own destruction
 Christina - also known as Sister Christina; employee at Madame Angela's brothel; transformed Leroy Hayes; destroyed by Conrad Jeavons
 John Crichton - son of Kenneth Crichton and Baroness Blood; suffers from a blood disorder
 Lucas Cross - former member of the NSA and the Order of Tyrana; father of Blade; transformed into a vampire while in Latveria in order to survive a terminal disease; sought prophecy to restore his soul
 Tara Cross - mother of Blade; attacked and killed by Deacon Frost while pregnant with her son; revived by Dracula
 Marianne Cutlass - born c. 1873; father was a pirate who was transformed into a vampire by Dracula and later destroyed by him; husband transformed by Dracula who, in turn, transformed her into a vampire; begged Dracula to kill her after Blade killed her husband, which he did
 Arthur de la Courte
 Marcos de la Triana -
 Marianne de la Triana -
 Baron Emile de Sevigny -
 Don Santiago de Valdez -
 Nick Diablo - c. 1926; gangster in Rome; tried to put out a hit on Dracula, but his allies were turned into vampires and attacked him
 Diana - vampire child; plotted to revive the 10 most evil people to ever set foot in New Orleans; abducted Rikki Eco and Ize, accidentally killed Ize; placed spirit of General Butler in Rikki
 Donsah -
 Dina Dracko -
 Draconis - transformed when he was a devout priest; became an exceptionally powerful vampire; increased his own power by feeding on other vampires; he tried to destroy Blade, but was weakened after Blade drained his blood, then later decapitated him; reanimated when Blade unwittingly fulfilled a prophecy
 Dracula (Vlad Tepes Dracula) - Lord of the Vampires; father of Lilith, Vlad Tepulus, Janus (the Golden Angel) and Xarus; ancestor of Frank Drake; transformed into a vampire by Lianda; destroyed by Montesi Formula; revived
 Sir Harry Everett -
 Fatboy -
 Jason Faust - old enemy of Quincy Harker; formerly employed Lucas Brand; killed by Brand after he was turned into a vampire by Dracula
 Dominic Ferrara -
 Elliot Flanders - member of the Huskies; wanted to tell his son he loved him, after which he was destroyed by Blade
 Bethany Flynn - girlfriend of Tara Algren; transformed by Dracula after being lured into his arms by Tara
 Freak - agent of Silvereye; stabbed by Blade when he rebelled against his control
 Angela Freeman - old friend of Misty Knight; destroyed
 Tom Freeman -
 Deacon Frost - vampire lord and former German scientist c. 1863; inadvertently injected with own serum when attacked by the husband of a test subject; responsible for the creation of Blade and Hannibal King
 Jean Garver- ex-wife of NYPD officer Lou Garver; transformed by Dracula; destroyed by Lou
 Giuseppe - c. 1926; former agent of Nick Diablo; transformed by Dracula
 Gladys -
 Tabitha Glance - destroyed
 Glory - member of the Bloodshadows; former lover of Blade; destroyed
 Gordski - empowered by Puishannt
 Grausum - German; former servant of Baron Blood, possibly destroyed by Jim Hammond
 Groza - member of Mortuus Invitus; led the group assisting Noah van Helsing's Vampire Hunters against the Adze; consumed by the spirits unleashed against Dracula by Aamshed
 Rudolph Hagstrom -
 Corker Haller -
 Edith Harker - daughter of Quincy and Elizabeth Harker; kidnapped and transformed into a vampire by Dracula; destroyed by Quincy
 Dr. Samuel Harkins - leader of the Brotherhood of Judas
 Harold H. Harold - ally of Quincy Harker's Vampire Hunters, and writer of "True Vampire Stories"; encountered and nursed Dracula when he was weak; ultimately transformed into a vampire by Dracula; destroyed by the Montesi Formula
 Hector -
 Hellcow (Bessie) - A vampire cow; encountered and destroyed by Howard the Duck; later revived, and becomes an ally of Deadpool
 Mrs. Hilmerson - destroyed
 Hrolf - leader of a coven that battled Blade
 Kuai Hua - former servant of Dracula; removed the stake from Dracula after he was destroyed by Blade's Vampire Hunters
 Huskies - a variation on vampires; revive as virtually mindless creatures trying to accomplish one last task from real life before being destroyed
 Jeanie -
 Jeannie -
 Melissa Jenkins -
 Jubilee - a depowered mutant and a member of the X-Men; originally infected with a bio-engineered virus by a vampire suicide bomber; was turned into a full vampire soon afterwards by Xarus, son of Dracula
 Juito -
 Jule -
 Julie -
 Julka - c. 16th century; daughter of a Transylvanian pastor; transformed by Dracula, destroyed by Solomon Kane
 Karla -
 Stefan Kero -
 Khiron (Victor Strange) - brother of Dr. Strange; also known as Baron Blood II
 Renne Kimbrell - destroyed by Blade
 Hannibal King - private investigator; created by Deacon Frost c. the late 1940s; former member of the Nightstalkers, the Midnight Sons and Borderline Investigations
 Kraska -
 Hauptmann Rudoplh Kriss - c. 1944; a Nazi who was possessed by Dracula
 Count Kronin -
 Kruzak -
 Kuyuk - a group of Charniputra vampires who were consumed by Dracula after his legions failed to stop Noah van Helsing's Vampire Hunters
 Lala - c. 1459; a minion of Nimrod the First who attempted to seduce Dracula
 Lamia - former priestess of Varnae in ancient Atlantis; in the 20th century she slaughtered the Bloodshadows and turned Glory into a vampire
 Thomas Lawson - a former constable; member of the Legion of the Damned
 Legion of the Damned - founded c. 1862; a group of 99 Confederate soldiers enslaved by Dracula who were used to save a group of Confederate soldiers containing the family of Annabelle St. John, only 13 survived; the second known group was based in London; also agents of Dracula; killed Madame Vanity and the entire brothel where Blade's mother formerly worked
 Lenore - formerly kept imprisoned in mist form within a bottle in Castle Dracula; later released by Dracula and sent after Rachel van Helsing and Frank Drake; destroyed when she was pulled in front of a spear by Dracula to save his own life
 Ursula Lensky - obsessed with Dracula; transformed by Dracula and sent to kill Rizzoli; destroyed by the police led by Lou Garver
 Anton Levka - c. 1459; briefly took over Castle Dracula after Dracula's capture by Turac; later destroyed by Dracula
 Lianda - empowered Dracula; destroyed
 Lilith - member of S.H.I.E.L.D.'s Howling Commandos; daughter of Dracula by his first wife Zofia; transformed by a gypsy named Gretchen into an unusual vampire; once killed by Quincy Harker after Dracula killed Harker's wife; seeks destruction of Dracula
 Madame Angela - owned a brothel c. 1930; incinerated by exposure to sunlight
 Maracen -
 Marguerita - grandmother of Carmen; duped the Frankenstein Monster into freeing Dracula; destroyed by it
 Marissa -
 Mary - an American girl who was transformed by Dracula in Paris; destroyed herself when he left her
 Millie Pat Mason -
 Ken Mitchell -
 Beatrice Montague - from New Orleans; sister of Victor; destroyed by Monica Rambeau
 Varkis - a vampire created by vampire cult known as the Creed from some flesh of Wolverine. He was killed by Wolverine and Blade.
 Victor Montague - from New Orleans; brother of Beatrice; destroyed by Monica Rambeau
 Luisa Morelli - c. 1926; former girlfriend of Nick Diablo; transformed by Dracula
 Dr. Michael Morbius a.k.a. Morbius the Living Vampire - former member of the Midnight Sons, the Nine and the Legion of Monsters; injected self with a mutated vampire bat serum, which transformed him into a vampire-like creature; cured when struck by lightning while consuming Spider-Man's blood; transformed back into a living vampire by Marie Laveau; further mutated by HYDRA.
 Morophla - from the Hyborian Era; one of the original vampires created in Atlantis; killed by Conan and Red Sonja
 Dr. Heinrich Mortte -
 Navarro - South American Indian who attempted to unleash a biological virus; encountered Hannibal King and was trapped in an explosion
 Laurie Neal - mother of Angelica and wife of Frank; bitten, then destroyed by Dracula
 Night Terror (Carl Blake) - former covert agent and mercenary; transformed into a vampire by Steppin' Razor; served as a host to Varnae; destroyed
 Emil Nikos - friend and co-worker of Morbius; killed by him after his transformation
 Nimrod - also known as Nimrod the First; pseudo-vampire lord; sent by Varnae to challenge Dracula; destroyed by Dracula
 Adri Nital - son of Taj; transformed by Dracula as a young child and kept strapped to a bed in an undead state; destroyed by villagers
 Taj Nital - former Vampire Hunter; father of Adri; throat was permanently damaged by a vampire bite, making him mute; eventually killed Adri due to vampirism; later transformed into a vampire; destroyed
 Nocturne -
 Audra Pennington - purchased Dracula's possessions from Lilith; transformed by Dracula and forced to return his belongings
 Maria Petrella - c. 1926; former agent of Nick Diablo; transformed by Dracula
 Jeff Phillips -
 Amber Piper - artist who, after being turned, painted a picture of a crucifix to destroy herself
 Ponce - old enemy of Blade; member of the Legion of the Damned
 Col. William Poprycz - fought during World War II in the 5th Infantry; captured by Baron Blood and convinced him to transform him; slaughtered his troops; destroyed
 Nina Price - member of S.H.I.E.L.D.'s Howling Commandos; daughter of Lissa Russell; she is a vampire/werewolf hybrid; also known as the Vampire by Night.
 Purebloods - a race of vampires that are the offspring of other Purebloods rather than having been transformed; known Purebloods are the Ancient Sect, Charles Barnabus, Janus, Legride of Vienna, and the Nosferatu Sect
 Charles Barnabus - Pureblood; executor of the Bloodstone estate
 Legride of Vienna - thought to be a Pureblood; captured by the Nosferati and infected with a hemorrhagic virus
 Nosferatu - A group of vampires who attempted to create a blood source for Pureblood vampires; kidnapped Dracula and Charles Barnabbas; plot foiled by Elsa Bloodstone
 Liza Pyne - former actress who was transformed by Dracula; destroyed by Raymond Coker
 Rank - ally of Blade; has never consumed human blood, so his body is rotting
 Xavier Rath -
 Anton Rizzoli - stole artifacts from Castle Dracula and sold them at an auction; defended himself from Dracula with a cross; was destroyed by Ursula Lensky under Dracula's direction
 Peter Roak - member of the Legion of the Damned; destroyed
 Angie Rodgers -
 Stephan Rook -
 Lord Ruthven - c. 18th Century
 Morgana St. Clair - member of the Brotherhood of Judas; destroyed
 Yves St. Munroe -
 Saracen - member of the Ancient; slept until the modern era when he was raised by the Reaper
 Henry Sage - transformed by Dracula c. 1795; was injected with the Daywalker/Sun-walker formula; destroyed by Blade
 Serge - agent of Varnae; destroyed by Dracula
 Andrea Simmons -
 Christopher Sinclair - former anemic patient and friend of Kenneth Crichton; transformed by Baroness Blood, but resisted her and allied with Union Jack III (Joey Chapman); destroyed
 Silas - head of a gunrunning ring; was destroyed by Blade, but reanimated when Blade unwittingly fulfilled a prophecy
 Siobahn - an Irish woman, the former lover of Namor and later Baron Blood I (John Falsworth) during World War II
 Hamilton Slade - c. 1897, London; member of Clan Akkaba; transformed by Dracula; his head was teleported off his body by Ferguson
 Ulysses Sojourner -
 Spider-Man - turned into a vampire by Jamal Afari; his radiated blood, according to Blade, would kill the enzymes that turned him into a vampire, which appears to hold true, as Spider-Man appears unaffected by this encounter in all of his other Marvel appearances
 Steppin' Razor - former head of the Los Angeles Yardi drug operation; empowered Night Terror; former agent of Marie Laveau and Varnae; destroyed
 Brother Steven - leader of a cult that were enemies of the Werewolf by Night
 Tatjana Stiles - formerly of the CIA; captured and tortured by Navarro in order to gain information; transformed into a vampire by Hannibal King to prevent her from dying; uses her abilities against enemies of the U.S.
Gorna Storski - A vampire from Camenca, Moldavia
 Lyza Strang - c. 1862; directed Dracula to slay her husband so Otto von Bismarck would become Prime Minister of the German states; betrayed Dracula, but was later transformed by him; destroyed by Abraham van Helsing
 Ilsa Strangway - middle-aged former actress and model; bartered the Black Mirror to Dracula in an attempt to regain her youth by becoming a vampire; allowed herself to be destroyed by Rachel van Helsing
 Maria Terrizi -
 Tessa - fed on runaways; encountered Cloak and Dagger and was defeated and brought before Dr. Strange
 Aaron Thorne - follower of Varnae; leader of the Bad Seed
 Tituba - c. 1691; a slave from the West Indies (Barbados); enamored by Dracula and sent to take vengeance among the people of Salem, Massachusetts for the death of Charity Brown
 Topher - born in 1900; transformed as a teen; befriended by the Runaways; attempted to seduce Nico and Karolina; destroyed by the solar energy within Karolina
 Torgo - former general in the army led against Attila the Hun; inadvertently buried alive; unearthed and transformed by a vampire hag that worked in a graveyard; destroyed by Dracula in a duel over leadership
 Tryks - a powerful generation of vampires that feed on regular vampires; known Tryks are Cilla and Rowskis
 Turac - c. 1459; a Turk who overthrew Dracula as a human; sent him to Lianda, who turned him into a vampire; later Dracula turns him into a vampire; destroyed by his daughter, Elianne, upon her discovering his condition
 Sir Winston Twindle -
 Uathacht - from the Hyborian Era; one of original vampires created in Atlantis; destroyed by Conan
 Undead MC - a group of vampires who encounter Johnny Blaze
 Charnel - leader of Undead MC
 Blivet - member of Undead MC
 Hairboy - member of Undead MC
 Roadkill - member of Undead MC
 Federico Valencia - transformed in the 15th century
The Vampire Zuvembie - also known as the Nightspawn; an African vampire turned into a zuvembie slave by having his spirit imprisoned by voodoo magic; battled the Thing and the Black Panther, who were aided by Brother Voodoo; had his spirit restored; disappeared after taking revenge on his enslavers
 Vampz - twin siblings who served Marie Leveau
 Elisabeth van Helsing - first wife of Abraham; turned into a vampire by the Children of Judas; destroyed by her husband
 Rachel van Helsing - a former Vampire Hunter; raised by Quincy Harker after her parents were killed by vampires; allowed herself to be destroyed by Wolverine after becoming a vampire
 Vane -
 Count Varma -
 Varnae - first Lord of the Vampires; passed power and title down to Dracula and died; revived in the modern age by Marie Laveau
 Varney -
 Count Varnis -
 Velanna - c. 1809; transformed by Dracula; destroyed by her husband
 Darius Venginian - took control of Frank Dalton and later Spencer to control Silvereye
 Verdelet - heir of Varnae; destroyed
 Count Vicaro -
 Anton Vierkin - leader of the Legion of the Damned; destroyed
 Sophia von Heinif -
 Isabel Vortok - Transylvanian barmaid transformed by Dracula
 Countess Vryslaw - c. the mid-19th century; transformed by Dracula, kept imprisoned for 20 years until discovered by Dracula; destroyed by her husband as he had a heart attack
 Wampyr - servant of Baron Blood; destroyed
 Wanda Warren -
 Mona Welles -
 Lucy WestenraOfficial Handbook of the Marvel Universe #14 ("Book of the Dead and Inactive II", March 1984), pg. 30; and Official Handbook of the Marvel Universe Deluxe Edition #20 ("Book of the Dead", November 1988), pg. 38 - daughter of a wealthy 19th century English family, killed by Dracula and revived as a vampire known as the "Bloofer Lady"; destroyed by Abraham Van Helsing and Arthur Holmwood, as recorded in Bram Stoker's novel
 Worm-Digger -
 Xarus - the traitorous son of Dracula who orchestrated his death; later killed when Dracula was resurrected by the X-Men
 Aldes Yancey -
 Yuki Onna - an Asian snow vampire; killed the mother of Michiyo Watanabe; allied with Dracula during the Ritual of Ascendance

Other versions
Ultimate Marvel
The Ultimate Marvel version of Vampires are the main villains in Ultimate Avengers 3. Their powers and abilities seem to be the same as the mainstream Marvel Universe, including sensitivity to religion, silver, and immense sunlight. The vampires are led by Anthony (a.k.a. Vampire-X), a vampire hunter that had been bitten and turned, and had stolen Iron Man's outdated suit to walk around in the sunlight. He was also a mentor to Blade, Stick, and Stone in the past. Since then, Blade has been moving his way through bosses throughout clans over the last 20 years. Vampire-X outmatched and turned the Nerd Hulk (a clone of Bruce Banner), and had the Nerd Hulk bite Stick and the new Daredevil. Captain America is later bitten and infected in an attack in the sewers, and is led into battle by the Nerd Hulk as the new boss after having killed Anthony with one punch. Later that night, hundreds of vampires are overrunning Nick Fury's Black Ops team guarding S.H.I.E.L.D.'s Triskelion in New York, turning a few Reserve Ultimates (like Giant-Men member Dave Scotty) and even killing Perun. However, Captain America's Super Soldier Serum blood later fights back the infection, after which he returns to normal, and uses Perun's Hammer to teleport the Triskelion to Iran. As hundreds of vampires end up dying, Blade then purges his sword into Stick's chest (now wearing Anthony's Iron Man suit) for the kill, while Captain America takes Perun's Hammer and slays the Nerd Hulk.

In other media
Television
 The Vampires appear in the Spider-Man animated series. They are seen in the episode "The Vampire Queen", led by Miriam Brooks.
 The Vampires appear in Blade: The Series, a continuation of the film series, as the primary antagonists of Blade, embodied by Marcus Van Sciver (portrayed by Neil Jackson).
 The Vampires are featured in Marvel Anime: Blade. This series focuses on a vampire organization called the Existence, which is formed and led by Deacon Frost. Its membership comprises vampires who have been genetically altered to have powerful beast-like forms and humans who believe that by joining the organization would leave them unharmed by the vampires. The Existence was showed to have some clashes with the vampires that work for the Vampire High Council. In the post-credits of "The Other Side of Darkness", Blade was showed by fighting the vampires that are followers of the Darkhold.
 The Vampires appear in the Avengers Assemble animated series. They are seen in the episodes "Blood Feud", "In Deep", "Exodus" and "Why I Hate Halloween".
 The Vampires appear in the Ultimate Spider-Man animated series. They are seen in the episodes "Blade" and "The Howling Commandos". The episode "Return to the Spider-Verse" Pt. 1 features a reality dominated by Vampires and ruled by the Lizard King. Those who were turned into vampires were returned to normal with the help of the Siege Perilous' fragment.
 The Vampires appear in Hulk and the Agents of S.M.A.S.H.. In the episode "Days of Future Smash: Dracula", the Vampires are shown with Dracula when the Leader proposes a plan for vampires to feed night and day through the Gamma Furnace blocking out the sun when the Hulk followed the Leader to 1890 during the Victorian era. When the Hulk is hit by a gamma version of the vampire strain, it results in a vampire-dominated present which is ruled by the Vampire Lord Hulk, who has done away with Dracula and the Leader and shows no vulnerability to the vampire weaknesses. After the Hulk uses the Sun that he unblocked to burn away the strain and then destroy the Gamma Furnace while defeating Dracula, the vampire-dominated present is undone.

Film
 The Vampires are the primary antagonists in the entire Blade film series. In all three films, Blade rises against a certain sect of the vampire community, slowly learning more and more about them while also having to handle his own emerging vampire instincts which he is both warned and taunted about.  Vampirism in the films and its spin-off television series are treated as mundane creatures. Humans mutated through a virus-like infection rather than a curse. They lack many of the more mystical powers and weaknesses of their comic-counterparts, such as shapeshifting, crosses, invitations, and true immortality (vampires merely age at a slower rate than humans do).
 In Blade, the main antagonist is Deacon Frost (portrayed by Stephen Dorff), the vampire who murdered and later converted Vanessa Brooks (portrayed by Sanaa Lathan), the mother of Blade. His group mostly comprises young 20-something looking vampires, such as the cocky Quinn (portrayed by Donal Logue) and Frost's lover Mercury (portrayed by Arly Jover), who rally against the older and wiser vampires, such as the vampire elder Gitano Dragonetti (portrayed by Udo Kier), who are seeking peace among the living. Frost's group kills the older vampires and attempt to revive La Magra, an ancient being who will supposedly grant immunity and imprison humanity for the benefit of all vampires. Frost and his entire sect are killed by Blade.
 In Blade II, Pureblood vampires are exposed to a pandemic known as the "Reaper virus", a mutation who are immune to all weaknesses (except ultraviolet light), kill humans, and turn any vampires fed on into the monstrous creatures that are more sinister than vampires. Vampire Lord Eli Damaskinos (portrayed by Thomas Kretschmann) recruits Blade to go after the Reapers' leader Jared Nomak (portrayed by Luke Goss), the only Reaper capable of sustaining his new existence, all other infected burning out within a few hours. Eli recruits Blade to join the "Bloodpack", a group of vampires who hunted Blade led by Nyssa Damaskinos (portrayed by Leonor Varela), Eli's daughter and one of the few vampires who actually respects Blade and is sympathetic, and sadistic enforcer Dieter Reinhardt (portrayed by Ron Perlman). After the Bloodpack is killed handling Reapers, Damaskinos reveals creating the Reaper virus to create a new race of vampires and that Nomak was simply a failed experiment, earning Nyssa's contempt towards Damaskinos confirming Nomak is his "son". While Blade kills Reinhardt, Damaskinos is cornered by Nyssa and Nomak and is killed. After Nomak infects Nyssa with the Reaper virus, Blade and Nomak have a ferocious battle, ending with Nomak committing suicide and Nyssa's dying wish of seeing the sunrise before she succumbs to the virus.
 In Blade: Trinity, a group of vampire explorers led by Danica Talos' (portrayed by Parker Posey) resurrects Dracula, otherwise known as Drake (portrayed by Dominic Purcell). Drake leads a group to create a cure for vampire weaknesses, while Blade and his new team create a vampire virus that can spread worldwide. Drake battles Blade one on one, where both seem to be evenly matched. Drake, impressed by this, offers a parting gift for Blade which, depending on the edition of the movie, means Drake either takes Blade's place when the cops arrive or he gives Blade more power, leaving it ambiguous if he has given into his vampire instincts.

Video games
 The Vampires appear in Marvel: Avengers Alliance''. While Blade, Dracula, and Morbius are the known vampires in the game, the vampire soldiers are Criminal Thralls, Criminal Vampires, Demonic Criminals, Demonic Mafiosos, Demonic Malefactors, Mafioso Ductus, Mafioso Thralls, Mafioso Vampires, Malefactor Ductus, Malefactor Thralls, and Malefactor Vampires.

References

External links
 Vampires at Marvel Wiki

Comics articles that need to differentiate between fact and fiction
Marvel Comics
 
Fictional Serbian people
Marvel Comics characters with accelerated healing
Marvel Comics characters with superhuman strength